Helle Ryslinge (born 10 January 1944) is a Danish director, screenwriter, playwright and actress.

Life and career 
Born in Copenhagen, Ryslinge started her career in the 1970s fringe theatre, writing and performing alongside Anne Marie Helger in the cabaret show Dameattraktioner. 

She made her directorial debut three years later with the satirical comedy Flamberede hjerter, which was a critical and commercial success. Her following film Sirup was entered into the main competition at the 47th edition of the Venice Film Festival, winning the Silver Lion for best screenplay, and got some commercial success, ranking as the third highest grossing Danish film of the year. Her last feature film, Halalabad Blues , had a troubled production and divided critics, leading the director to decide to leave filmmaking.

Filmography 
 Flamberede hjerter (1986)
 Sirup (1990)
 Carlo og Ester (1994) 
 Halalabad Blues (2002)
 Larger Than Life (documentary, 2003)

References

External links
 Helle Ryslinge at Den Store Danske Encyklopædi
 

1944 births
Living people
Danish film actresses
Danish television actresses
20th-century Danish actresses
21st-century Danish actresses
Film directors from Copenhagen
Danish women screenwriters 
Danish women film directors
Actresses from Copenhagen